Dimbokro Airport  is an airport serving Dimbokro, Côte d'Ivoire.

See also
Transport in Côte d'Ivoire

References

 OurAirports - Dimbokro
 Great Circle Mapper - Dimbokro

Airports in Ivory Coast
Buildings and structures in Lacs District
N'Zi Region